La pérgola de las flores is a 1965 internationally co-produced comedy film directed by Román Viñoly Barreto based on the Chilean musical of the same name. It was entered into the 4th Moscow International Film Festival.

Cast
 Marujita Díaz (as Maruja Diaz)
 Antonio Prieto
 Beatriz Bonnet
 Teresa Blasco
 María Antonia Tejedor (as M Antonia Tejedor)
 Carmen Caballero
 Mariel Comber
 Rodolfo Onetto
 Dringue Farías (as Dringue Farias)
 Tincho Zabala
 Guido Gorgatti

References

External links
 

1965 films
1965 comedy films
Argentine comedy films
Chilean comedy films
Spanish comedy films
1960s Spanish-language films
Films directed by Román Viñoly Barreto
1960s Argentine films